Roseovarius gaetbuli is a Gram-negative, aerobic and non-motile bacterium from the genus of Roseovarius which has been isolated from tidal flat sediments from the Yellow Sea in Korea.

References 

Rhodobacteraceae
Bacteria described in 2014